Ernst Pitner (1838–1896) was an Austrian lieutenant who accompanied Archduke Maximilian to Mexico in 1864. Pitner kept a journal that described the exploits of the ill-conceived military campaign to make Maximilian emperor of Mexico. He was captured along with Maximilian and other officers, but unlike a number of his companions, he escaped execution and returned to Austria.

Pitner's journal was translated and edited by Gordon Etherington-Smith, and published as a book called Maximilian's Lieutenant: A Personal History of the Mexican Campaign 1864-67. In this book Pitner provides a firsthand account of life in Mexico from the viewpoint of an Austrian soldier, describing the local populace, the battles and his personal journeys in the country.

References

Austrian soldiers
1838 births
1896 deaths